The Einaudi Institute for Economics and Finance (EIEF) is a Rome based economics research institute, funded by the Bank of Italy. 

The Institute builds on the tradition of its predecessor, the Ente Luigi Einaudi, that has fostered economic research in Italy for the past fifty years.

The Einaudi Institute for Economics and Finance produces research, with an emphasis on policy relevant topics. It also seeks to influence public thinking and to train the next generation of scholars by running seminar series, graduate level courses and conferences.

External links
 EIEF Official Website

Economic research institutes